Phosphatidylinositol glycan anchor biosynthesis class U protein is a protein that in humans is encoded by the PIGU gene.

The protein encoded by this gene shares similarity with Saccharomyces cerevisiae Cdc91, a predicted integral membrane protein that may function in cell division control. The protein encoded by this gene is the fifth subunit of GPI transamidase that attaches GPI-anchors to proteins.

References

Further reading